Laughter, Tears and Rage was the sole album produced by Act - the short musical collaboration between Thomas Leer and ex-Propaganda vocalist Claudia Brücken. Originally scheduled to be titled Name Dropping: Songs for Young Sinners it was released , by ZTT Records. The album was deleted by ZTT in the early 90s. It was eventually reissued on CD in 2004, as a one disc album and as a three disc box set entitled Laughter, Tears and Rage - The Anthology.

Like most ZTT releases, the LP and CD releases differed quite a lot in track listing. The LP and cassette were both released as 12 tracks, while the CD was 14. However, a number of tracks were exclusive to each format. "Short Story" and "Theme from Laughter" were LP only, while "Poison" and "Bloodrush" were issued only on CD and cassette, and "Heaven Knows I'm Miserable Now" and "The 3rd Planet" were CD only.

Singles 
The album featured three singles, "Snobbery and Decay", "Absolutely Immune" and "I Can't Escape from You". None of these set the charts alight with lead single "Snobbery and Decay" reaching #60 upon release. A fourth single, "Chance" was withdrawn the day of release due to unauthorised samples.

2004 Reissue 
Also a 3-CD box set version was released, titled Laughter, Tears and Rage - The Anthology, comprising almost four hours of material. Apart from the reissued album on the first disc, a second disc anthologised the extended mixes, while a third disc features a collection of rare and unreleased remixes, and an unreleased track: "Body Electric".

Love & Hate (2015) 

The album was reissued in a further different configuration in 2015 under the title Love & Hate: A Compact Introduction. The release consisted of a "director's cut" of the album (comprising all of the original tracks plus "Body Electric", in a different order) on one CD, with various remixes and B-sides on a second CD.

Track listings 
All songs written and composed by Thomas Leer and Claudia Brücken, except where noted.

LP (1988) 
 UK: ZTT / ZQLP1

Tracks A5 and B5 are listed on the labels only.

CD (1988) 
UK: ZTT / ZQCD1

Cassette (1988) 
 UK: ZTT / ZQMC1

CD (2004) 
 UK: ZTT / ZTT185CD

Box set (2004) 
 UK: ZTT / ZTT185CDX

 Disc one: "(More) Laughter, Tears and Rage"
Same tracks as 2004 CD.

Personnel 
Act
 Thomas Leer – keyboards, vocals
 Claudia Brücken – vocals

Additional musicians
Andy Gill
Betsy Cook
Luís Jardim
Michael Dempsey
Neil Hubbard
Pablo Cook
Phil Palmer
Chris Senior – piano on "Theme from Laughter"
Casbah – scat on "Heaven Knows I'm Miserable Now" (credited to Lucky Gordon on box set)
David Bedford  – string arrangements on "Snobbery and Decay"

References 

1988 debut albums
Albums produced by Trevor Horn
Albums produced by Stephen Lipson
ZTT Records albums
2004 compilation albums